Thomas Finstad (born 10 January 1978) is a retired Norwegian footballer. He plays as a striker.

He started his career by IL Jutul and joined 1994 to Bærum SK. It followed short spells for Stabæk and Strømsgodset before rejoining Bærum in 2008. In his comeback-season for Bærum he scored 10 goals.

Notes

1978 births
Living people
Sportspeople from Bærum
Norwegian footballers
Bærum SK players
Stabæk Fotball players
Strømsgodset Toppfotball players
Eliteserien players
Association football forwards